Nick+ (also known as Nickelodeon Plus or Nick Plus) is an international streaming video service owned by Paramount Global that offers access to many Nickelodeon shows. It was launched by Corus Entertainment in Canada on December 10, 2019, as an Amazon Prime Video channel. It would later also become accessible on Apple TV channels. A couple years later on August 31, 2022, Nick+ in Canada was shutdown with all of their Nickelodeon programming being moved to Paramount+ in Canada. On March 28, 2023, Nick+ in Japan will be shutdown with all of their Nickelodeon programming being moved to Paramount+ in Japan.

Available programming

References

External links
 

Paramount Global
Nickelodeon
Internet properties established in 2019
Internet television channels
Subscription video on demand services
Internet television streaming services